Naghan is a city in Chaharmahal and Bakhtiari Province, Iran.

Naghan may also refer to:
 Naghan-e Olya, Chaharmahal and Bakhtiari Province
 Naghan-e Sofla, Chaharmahal and Bakhtiari Province
 Naghan District, in Chaharmahal and Bakhtiari Province
 Naghan Rural District, in Chaharmahal and Bakhtiari Province